The 12th European Athletics Championships were held from 29 August to 3 September 1978 in the Stadion Evžena Rošického in Prague, the capital city of Czechoslovakia (present-day Czech Republic).  Contemporaneous reports on the event were given in the Glasgow Herald.

There were a number of disqualifications because of infringements of IAAF doping rules resulting in 18-month bans for shot putter Yevgeniy Mironov, javelin thrower Vasiliy Yershov, and pentathletes Nadiya Tkachenko and Yekaterina Gordiyenko, all competing for the Soviet Union, as well as shot putter Elena Stoyanova from Bulgaria.

Men's results
Complete results were published.

Track
1971 |1974 |1978 |1982 |1986 |

 Pietro Mennea ran 10.19 in the heats, which was a new championship record.

Field
1971 |1974 |1978 |1982 |1986 |

†: In shot put, Yevgeniy Mironov initially finished second (20.87m), but was disqualified for an infringement of IAAF doping rules.

Women's results

Track
1971 |1974 |1978 |1982 |1986 |

 Grażyna Rabsztyn (Poland), who was disqualified in the final, ran a championship record of 12.60 in the semifinal.

Field
1971 |1974 |1978 |1982 |1986 |

‡: In pentathlon, Nadiya Tkachenko (URS) initially finished 1st (4744pts), but was disqualified for an infringement of IAAF doping rules.
 Vilma Bardauskienė broke the world record with a jump 7.09 metres in the qualification round.

Medal table

Participation
According to an unofficial count, 847 athletes from 30 countries participated in the event, 157 athletes less than the official number of 1004, and one country more than the official number of 29 as published.  The significantly higher official number might include coaches and/or officials. 

 (11)
 (31)
 (24)
 (1)
 (82)
 (10)
 (72)
 (33)
 (51)
 (1)
 (13)
 (25)
 (5)
 (9)
 (43)
 (2)
 (6)
 (25)
 (16)
 (46)
 (4)
 (24)
 (92)
 Spain (16)
 (31)
 (21)
 (5)
 (69)
 (64)
 (14)

References

External links 
 The EAA Official Website
 Athletix

 
European Athletics Championships
European Athletics Championships
European Athletics Championships
International athletics competitions hosted by Czechoslovakia
Sports competitions in Prague
International athletics competitions hosted by the Czech Republic
Athletics Championships
Athletics Championships
Athletics Championships
1970s in Prague